Steve Fisher may refer to:

 Steve Fisher (American basketball coach) (born 1945), American college basketball coach
 Steve Fisher (writer) (1913–1980), American writer of satirical stories
 Steve Fisher (soccer) (born 1981), American soccer player
 Steve Fisher (snowboarder) (born 1982), American snowboarder
 Steve Fisher (cyclist) (born 1990), American cyclist
 Steve Fisher (Neighbours), fictional character on the Australian soap opera Neighbours
 Steve Fisher (kayaker), extreme whitewater kayaker and filmmaker